The America Zone was one of the three regional zones of the 1967 Davis Cup.

7 teams entered the America Zone: 4 teams competed in the North & Central America Zone, while 3 teams competed in the South America Zone. The winner of each sub-zone would play against each other to determine who moved to the Inter-Zonal Zone to compete against the winners of the Eastern Zone and Europe Zone.

The United States defeated Mexico in the North & Central America Zone final, and Ecuador defeated Argentina in the South America Zone final. In the Americas Inter-Zonal Final, Ecuador defeated the United States and progressed to the Inter-Zonal Zone.

North & Central America Zone

Draw

Semifinals

Caribbean/West Indies vs. United States

Mexico vs. New Zealand

Final

Mexico vs. United States

South America Zone

Draw

Semifinals

Argentina vs. Venezuela

Final

Argentina vs. Ecuador

Americas Inter-Zonal Final

Ecuador vs. United States

References

External links
Davis Cup official website

Davis Cup Americas Zone
America Zone
Davis Cup